Feeding the Wolves is the fifth studio album by the American alternative metal band 10 Years, and their third major label release. The album debuted at No. 17 on the Billboard 200 chart, with 19,000 units sold.

Background
The album was produced by Grammy-nominated producer Howard Benson and mixed by Chris Lord-Alge. The band has mentioned this will be their heaviest material to date and "very similar to some of their early songs." The 10-track album was the Tennessee band's first since founding guitarist Matt Wantland left the group in 2009.

Throughout the first half of 2010, the band went back and forth between putting on live shows and working on the album in the studio. During this time, they debuted a few new songs live, including "Dead in the Water", "Now is the Time", and the new album's first single "Shoot It Out".

The bonus track "Silhouette of a Life" was also included on their 2004 album Killing All That Holds You.

In June 2011 a video was shot for "Fix Me" and released in later 2011.

Track listing

Deluxe edition

On the deluxe edition of the album, "Fade Into (the Ocean)" appears as track 11, and the bonus track "Running in Place" take the place of track 10. On both editions of the album, the iTunes bonus track appears at the end of the album.

Personnel

Band
 Jesse Hasek – vocals
 Ryan "Tater" Johnson – guitar, backing vocals
 Lewis "Big Lew" Cosby – bass
 Brian Vodinh – drums, guitar

Production
 Howard Benson – producer
 Chris Lord-Alge – mixing

References

External links 

 Short interview

10 Years (band) albums
2010 albums
Albums produced by Howard Benson
Universal Records albums